Gojko Šušak Avenue is an avenue in northeastern Zagreb, Croatia. It serves as part of the boundary between city districts Maksimir and Gornja Dubrava. Spanning between Štefanovec Road and Dubrava Avenue, the avenue has four lanes and a parking lot along its western side. Its most important intersection is with Oporovečka Road. At its southern end, the road continues as the short four-lane Mandlova Road. Some of the most important buildings in Zagreb are located on the Avenue. In particular, Clinical Hospital Dubrava (also referred to as Nova bolnica, New hospital), located on its eastern side, and the Police Academy, located on the western side. The avenue north of the busy Oporovečka Road is underused, but there are projects to make it a part of the inner city ring road and extend it to the route of the planned northern arm of Zagreb bypass. The avenue is named after Gojko Šušak, the late Croatian Minister of Defense. Before Šušak's death it was named Scout Alley.

Roads in Zagreb